Real Club Deportivo Córdoba is a defunct Spanish football team from Córdoba, Andalusia. Real Córdoba was founded in 1934 and dissolved in 1954.

History
Real Córdoba was founded in 1934 as Racing Fútbol Club. The club changed its name in 1941 to Club Deportivo Córdoba adding real-suffix in 1944.

In 1954, RCD Córdoba was dissolved due to the many debts. At same time, Córdoba CF was founded for substitute RCD Córdoba.

Club names
Racing Fútbol Club – (1934–1941)
Club Deportivo Córdoba – (1941–1944)
Real Club Deportivo Córdoba – (1944–1954)

Season to season

9 seasons in Segunda División
4 seasons in Tercera División

External links
Córdoba CF History 

Association football clubs established in 1934
Association football clubs disestablished in 1954
Defunct football clubs in Andalusia
1934 establishments in Spain
1954 disestablishments in Spain
Segunda División clubs